The 1940 Washington Huskies football team was an American football team that represented the University of Washington during the 1940 college football season. In its 11th season under head coach Jimmy Phelan, the team compiled a 7–2 record, finished in second place in the Pacific Coast Conference, was ranked No. 10 in the final AP Poll, and outscored its opponents by a combined total of 169 to 54. The Huskies' only two losses came to Minnesota and Stanford teams that were ranked Nos. 1 and 2, respectively, in the final AP Poll. Bill Marx was the team captain.

Schedule

NFL Draft selections
Three University of Washington Huskies were selected in the 1941 NFL Draft, which lasted 22 rounds with 204 selections.

References

Washington
Washington Huskies football seasons
Washington Huskies football